Alka Matewa (born April 26, 1987) is a Congolese-Belgian Actor and mixed martial artist.

Early life

Alka Matewa was born on 26 April 1987 in Kinshasa, Congo,  the son of Pierre Maytewa and Lucie Nsuele. Both parents are Congolese. Alka's background can be specifically traced back to the Ba KONGO people.

Alka is born in congo but spent some of his early years in France ( Monthlerry 91 ) and in Germany ( Köln ) The Family finally moved to Brussels, Belgium in 1998. They arrive in a neighborhood named Ixelles (1050).

Television

Films

Mixed martial arts career
Matewa made his mixed martial arts debut on August 28, 2010 defeating T.J Coletti by TKO in the first round.

Bellator
Matewa then signed with Bellator and made his debut for the promotion at Bellator 47 against fellow muay thai striker Alex Ricci.

He lost to Duochonlek by decision at MAX Muay Thai 2 in Pattaya, Thailand on June 29, 2013.

Mixed martial arts record

|-
|Win
|align=center|4–2
| Alix JeanGuillame
|TKO 
|EBD 5
|
|align=center|1
|align=center|4:37
| La Louvière, Belgium
|-
|Win
|align=center|3–2
| Makeshati
|KO (kick liver)
|WBK 6
|
|align=center|1
|align=center|4:18
| Shanghai, China
|-
|Win
|align=center|2–2
| Oleg Kosinov
|KO (Head Kick)
|SOMMAF - Steel Battle 1
|
|align=center|2
|align=center|3:58
| Stary Oskol, Russia
|
|-
|Loss
|align=center|1–2
| Alex Ricci
|TKO (elbows and punches)
|Bellator 47
|
|align=center|2
|align=center|2:40
| Rama, Ontario, Canada
|
|-
|Loss
|align=center|1–1
| Jesse Ronson
|Submission (armbar)
|Wreck MMA - Strong and Proud
|
|align=center|1
|align=center|4:51
| Gatineau, Quebec, Canada
|
|-
|Win
|align=center|1-0
| T.J. Coletti
|TKO (punches)
|XCC - Battle at the Border 10
|
|align=center|1
|align=center|0:40
| Algonac, Michigan, United States
|

Muay Thai & Kickboxing record
 2018 Phoenix Muay Thai World champion - 80,00 kg
 2013 WCFS World K-1 rules champion - 80,00 kg
 2012 WCFS European muay thai champion -76,00 kg
 2012 WKN Full Muay Thai Rules Intercontinental Champion -72,6 kg
 2006 BKBMO Belgium Champion 
 Benelux Champion BKBMO 
 European Champion WCFSC

|-
|-  bgcolor="#CCFFCC"
| 2018-10-13 || Win ||align=left| Redouane El Chapo || PSM Fight Night || Brussels, Belgium || no contest || 1 || 2:32 
|-
|-  bgcolor="#CCFFCC"
| 2019-05-18 || Win ||align=left| Evret Manga || Warrior's Fight Night || Leuven, Belgium || Disqualifcation || 1 || 2:40 
|-
|-  bgcolor="#CCFFCC"
| 2018-10-13 || Win ||align=left| Jonathan Lecat || Phoenix 10 World Title || Brussels, Belgium || KO || 2 || 2:12 
|-
|-  bgcolor="#FFBBBB"
| 2016-06-05|| Loss||align=left| Alexander Stetsurenko || |ACB KB 6: Battle in Brussels || Brussels, Belgium || Decision || 3 || 3:00
|-
|-  bgcolor="#FFBBBB"
| 2015-10-24|| Loss||align=left| Yohan Lidon || La Nuit des Challenges 14 || Saint-Fons, France || Decision || 5 || 3:00
|-
! style=background:white colspan=9 | 
|- 
|-  bgcolor="#FFBBBB"
| 2015-08-22|| Loss ||align=left| Tengnueng Sitjaesairoong || Thai Fight  || Thailand || Decision || 3 || 3:00 
|-
|-  bgcolor="#FFBBBB"
| 2015-08-01|| Loss ||align=left| Baosheriguleng || CFC Kungfu || Tongliao, China || Decision || 3 || 3:00
|-
|-  bgcolor="#FFBBBB"
| 2015-07-24 || Loss ||align=left| Fu Gaofeng || Shandong haohan || Linyi, China || Decision || 3 || 3:00 
|-
|-  bgcolor="#FFBBBB"
| 2015-05-24 || Loss ||align=left| Fu Gaofeng || Legend of Winners || Ningxia, China || Decision || 3 || 3:00 
|-
|-  bgcolor="#CCFFCC"
| 2015-05-24 || Win ||align=left| Wang Lixiang || Legend of Winners || Ningxia, China || TKO || 1 || 0:52 
|-
|-  bgcolor="#FFBBBB"
| 2015-05-09 || Loss ||align=left| Jackson Souza || Muaythai Fury || Phuket, Thailand || Decision || 3 || 3:00 
|-
|-  bgcolor="#FFBBBB"
| 2015-04-18|| Loss ||align=left| Bai Jinbin || CKF || Beijing, China || Decision || 3 || 3:00 
|-
|-  bgcolor="#CCFFCC"
| 2015-01-31 || Win ||align=left| Duangsompong Kor Tapaotong || Muaythai Fury || Phuket, Thailand || KO (Hook) || 3 || 
|-
|-  bgcolor="#FFBBBB"
| 2014-11-22 || Loss ||align=left| Saiyok Pumpanmuang || 2014 Thai Fight - 72.5 kg Tournament 1/2 Finals || Thailand || KO (Elbows) || 1 ||
|-
|-  bgcolor="#CCFFCC"
| 2014-10-25|| Win || align=left| Ben Hodge || 2014 Thai Fight -72,5 kg/160 lb Tournament, Quarter Finals  ||Bangkok, Thailand || Decision || 3 || 3:00
|-
|-  bgcolor="#FFBBBB"
| 2014-09-20 || Loss || align=left| Sudsakorn Sor Klinmee || Thai Fight Vietnam || Vietnam || Decision || 3 || 3:00
|-
|-  bgcolor="#FFBBBB"
| 2014-06-28 ||Loss ||align=left| Saiyok Pumpanmuang || Thai Fight Macao || Macau, China || Decision || 3 || 3:00
|- 
|-  bgcolor="#CCFFCC"
| 2014-06-05 || Win ||align=left| Yacouba Cisse || Mionnay || France ||  Decision || 3 || 3:00
|-
|-  bgcolor="#FFBBBB"
| 2014-05-24 ||Loss ||align=left| Johane Beausejour || Elite Fight Night, Semi Finals || Germany || Decision || 3 || 3:00
|- 
|-  bgcolor="#CCFFCC"
| 2014-05-11 || Win ||align=left| Samuel Andoche || Le Défi du Nack Muay 5 || France || TKO (doctor stoppage) || 1 || 
|-
|-  bgcolor="#FFBBBB"
| 2014-01-04 || Loss ||align=left| Kongchak || Suk Singpatong + Sit Numnoi || Phuket, Thailand || Decision || 3 || 3:00
|-
|-  bgcolor="#FFBBBB"
| 2013-06-29 || Loss ||align=left| Dernchonlek Sor.Sor.Niyom || MAX Muay Thai 2 || Pattaya, Thailand || Decision || 3 || 3:00
|-
|-  bgcolor="#FFBBBB"
| 2013-06-06 || Loss ||align=left| Fang Bian || Wu Lin Feng || Dubai, United Arab Emirates || Decision || 3 || 3:00
|-  bgcolor="#CCFFCC"
| 2013-05-12 || Win ||align=left| Walid Attadlaoui || || Brussels, Belgium || TKO || 5 || 
|-
! style=background:white colspan=9 |
|-
|-  bgcolor="#CCFFCC"
| 2013-05-04|| Win || align=left| Cédric de Keirsmaeker || Ultimate Takedown 5||Brussels, Belgium || TKO ||  ||
|-
|-  bgcolor="#CCFFCC"
| 2013-03-03|| Win || align=left| Abderahim Chafay || Ikuza 2||Brussels, Belgium || TKO || 4 ||3:00
|-
|-  bgcolor="#CCFFCC"
| 2013-03-03|| Win || align=left| Mohamed Abdelaim || Ikuza 1||Brussels, Belgium || TKO || 4 ||3:00
|-
! style=background:white colspan=9 |
|-
|-  bgcolor="#CCFFCC"
| 2012-11-03 || Win ||align=left|  Marco Re || Glory 3: Rome - 70 kg Slam Tournament || Rome, Italy || Decision (Unanimous) || 3 || 3:00
|-
|-  bgcolor= "#FFBBBB"
| 2012-08-24 || Loss ||align=left| Alim Nabiev || W5 Fighter Moscow XIII || Moscow, Russia ||  Decision || 3 ||  3:00  
|-
|-  bgcolor="#CCFFCC"
| 2012-06-23|| Win || align=left| Erkan Varol ||WKN Turkey ||Kahramanmaraş, Turkey || Decision (Unanimous) || 5 || 3:00
|-
! style=background:white colspan=9 |
|- 
|-  bgcolor="#CCFFCC"
| 2012-05-27|| Win || align=left| Matthias Ibssa || 'Slamm!! IV||Amsterdam, the Netherlands || Decision (Unanimous) || 3 || 3:00 
|-  bgcolor="#FFBBBB"
| 2012-03-04 || Loss ||align=left| Tayfun Ozcan || Force & Honneur || Brussels, Belgium || Decision || 3 || 3:00
|-  bgcolor="#CCFFCC"
| 2012-02-04 || Win ||align=left| Sonny Dagraed || Battle Arena || Zwevegem, Belgium || TKO || 3 || 3:00
|-
|-
| colspan=9 | Legend:

References

External links

Living people
Belgian male mixed martial artists
Belgian male actors
Welterweight mixed martial artists
Mixed martial artists utilizing Muay Thai
Belgian Muay Thai practitioners
1987 births
Sportspeople from Kinshasa
21st-century Democratic Republic of the Congo people